Thomas H. "Pat" Deasley (November 17, 1857 – April 1, 1943) was a 19th-century professional baseball player.  Deasley primarily played catcher during his eight-year career from 1881 to 1888.  Deasley played for the Boston Red Stockings, St. Louis Browns, New York Giants, and Washington Nationals over the course of his career.

He died on April 1, 1943 in Philadelphia, Pennsylvania and is interred at the Mount Moriah Cemetery.

References

External links

1857 births
1943 deaths
19th-century baseball players
Major League Baseball catchers
Boston Red Caps players
St. Louis Browns (AA) players
New York Giants (NL) players
Washington Nationals (1886–1889) players
Baltimore (minor league baseball) players
Rochester (minor league baseball) players
Davenport Hawkeyes players
Baseball players from Philadelphia
Burials at Mount Moriah Cemetery (Philadelphia)